Dalewo may refer to the following places:
Dalewo, Greater Poland Voivodeship (west-central Poland)
Dalewo, Drawsko County in West Pomeranian Voivodeship (north-west Poland)
Dalewo, Stargard County in West Pomeranian Voivodeship (north-west Poland)